Thomas S. Baer (1843–1906) was an American jurist who served as a judge on the Supreme Bench of Baltimore City (now the Circuit Court of Maryland for Baltimore City) in the United States of America from 1903 until his death in 1906.

Biography
Born in Baltimore, Maryland, March 17, 1843. Son of Rev. John Baer, an elder/minister of  the Baltimore Annual Conference of the Methodist Episcopal Church. Graduated from the Central High School of Baltimore, (later renamed The Baltimore City College, 1868). Studied law in the office of William S. Waters. Admitted to the Maryland bar May 18, 1865.  Married Elizabeth S. Beacham (d. 26 December 1891); no children. Died July 18, 1906, in Baltimore, Maryland.

Professional career
Thomas S. Baer's law practice specialized in equity and real estate matters. Practiced law with John T. McGlone, (1865–1872), and with Mr. Isaac McCurley, (1872–1875). Baer was elected to the Maryland House of Delegates in the General Assembly of Maryland from Baltimore City District 2, in 1894. He was also a member of the Baltimore City Board of School Commissioners from 1884 to 1888. The 18th President of the Bar Association of Baltimore City, (1896–1897), Baer taught law from at the University of Maryland School of Law, 1893–1903, where he lectured on real property, titles and copyrights.

References

Members of the Maryland House of Delegates
Maryland lawyers
Lawyers from Baltimore
1843 births
1906 deaths
Maryland state court judges
Baltimore City College alumni
19th-century American politicians
19th-century American judges